York Township is one of the fourteen townships of Union County, Ohio, United States.  The 2010 census found 1,334 people in the township.

Geography
Located in the northwestern part of the county, it borders the following townships:
Washington Township - north
Jackson Township - northeast
Claibourne Township - east
Taylor Township - southeast
Liberty Township - south
Perry Township, Logan County - southwest
Bokes Creek Township, Logan County - northwest

No municipalities are located in York Township, although it has the unincorporated communities of Somersville and York Center.

Name and history
It is one of ten York Townships statewide.  The township was organized in 1834.

Government
The township is governed by a three-member board of trustees, who are elected in November of odd-numbered years to a four-year term beginning on the following January 1. Two are elected in the year after the presidential election and one is elected in the year before it. There is also an elected township fiscal officer, who serves a four-year term beginning on April 1 of the year after the election, which is held in November of the year before the presidential election. Vacancies in the fiscal officership or on the board of trustees are filled by the remaining trustees.

References

External links
County website

Townships in Union County, Ohio
Townships in Ohio